Thyreophora ("shield bearers", often known simply as "armored dinosaurs") is a group of armored ornithischian dinosaurs that lived from the Early Jurassic until the end of the Cretaceous.

Thyreophorans are characterized by the presence of body armor lined up in longitudinal rows along the body. Primitive forms had simple, low, keeled scutes or osteoderms, whereas more derived forms developed more elaborate structures including spikes and plates. Most thyreophorans were herbivorous and had relatively small brains for their body size.

Thyreophora includes various subgroups, including the suborders Ankylosauria and Stegosauria. In both the suborders, the forelimbs were much shorter than the hindlimbs, particularly in stegosaurs. The clade has been defined as the group consisting of all species more closely related to Ankylosaurus than to Triceratops. Thyreophora is the sister group of Cerapoda within Genasauria.

Groups of thyreophorans

Basal thyreophorans 
Basal thyreophorans form a grade leading to Ankylosauria and Stegosauria, or are instead sister to Ankylosauria with Stegosauria being more basal than either of them. 

These were small-to-medium size dinosaurs with small, primitive plates. Some of them are thought to have walked bipedally. The majority of these, such as Scelidosaurus, Scutellosaurus, Emausaurus, and Yuxisaurus are known from the Northern Hemisphere, in North America, Europe and China.

Ankylosauria

Among the Ankylosauria, the two main groups are the Euankylosauria (containing ankylosaurids and nodosaurids) and the Parankylosauria.

Ankylosaurids are one of the two families of Euankylosauria. They are noted by the presence of a large tail club composed of distended vertebrae that have fused into a single mass. They were heavy-set and heavily armored from head to tail in bony armor, even down to minor features such as the eyelids. Spikes and nodules, often of horn, were set into the armor. The head was flat, stocky, with little or no "neck", roughly shovel-shaped and characterized by two spikes on either side of the head approximately where the ears and cheeks were. Euoplocephalus tutus is perhaps the best-known ankylosaurid.

Nodosauria

Nodosaurids, the other family in the Euankylosauria, may actually include the ancestors of the ankylosaurids. They lived during the middle Jurassic (approx 170 mya) on up through the late Cretaceous (66 mya) and, while armored as the ankylosaurids, did not have a tail club. Instead, the bony bumps and spikes that covered the rest of their body continued out to the tail and/or were augmented with sharp spines. Two examples of nodosaurs are Sauropelta and Edmontonia, the latter most notable for its formidable forward-pointing shoulder spikes.

Parankylosauria

The Parankylosauria are a far more basal group of ankylosaurs recognized as a distinct group in 2021. They may have diverged from euankylosaurs during the mid-Jurassic. Unlike the euankylosaurians, these had a Gondwanan distribution, being known from southern South America, Australia, and Antarctica. They retain more basal traits such as longer and more slender limbs, but the most distinctive trait are their tail weapons or macuahuitls (named after the weapon of the same name), which consist of a flat array of osteoderms that form a fan-like structure on the underside of the tail. This structure is similar to but distinct from the thagomizers of stegosaurians and the tail clubs of ankylosaurids. Macahuitls are completely known from Stegouros and possibly from fragmentary remains in Antarctopelta.

Stegosauria

The suborder Stegosauria comprises Stegosauridae and Huayangosauridae. These dinosaurs lived mostly from the Middle to Late Jurassic, although some fossils have been found in the Cretaceous. Stegosaurs had very small heads with simple, leaf-like teeth. Stegosaurs possessed rows of plates and/or spikes running down the dorsal midline and elongated dorsal vertebra. It has been suggested that stegosaur plates functioned in control of body temperature (thermoregulation) and/or were used as a display to identify members of a species, as well as to attract mates and intimidate rivals. Well known stegosaurs are Stegosaurus and Kentrosaurus.

Classification

Taxonomy
While ranked taxonomy has largely fallen out of favor among dinosaur paleontologists, a few 21st century publications have retained the use of ranks, though sources have differed on what its rank should be. Most have listed Thyreophora as an unranked taxon containing the traditional suborders Stegosauria and Ankylosauria, though Thyreophora is also sometimes classified as a suborder, with Ankylosauria and Stegosauria as infraorders.

Phylogeny
Thyreophora was first named by Nopcsa in 1915. Thyreophora was defined as a clade by Paul Sereno in 1998, as "all genasaurs more closely related to Ankylosaurus than to Triceratops". Thyreophoroidea was first named by Nopcsa in 1928 and defined by Sereno in 1986, as "Scelidosaurus, Ankylosaurus, their most recent common ancestor and all of its descendants". Eurypoda was first named by Sereno in 1986 and defined by him in 1998, as "Stegosaurus, Ankylosaurus, their most recent common ancestor and all of their descendants". The following cladogram shows the phylogenetic analysis of Riguetti et al (2022); it incorporates the ankylosaurian taxonomy of Soto-Acuña et al. (2021).

In 2020, as part of his monograph on Scelidosaurus, David Norman revised the relationships of early thyreophorans, finding that Stegosauria was the most basal branch, with Scutellosaurus, Emausaurus and Scelidosaurus being progressive stem groups to Ankylosauria, rather than to Stegosauria+Ankylosauria. A cladogram is given below:

See also 
 thyreophoroi, Greek soldiers bearing a thyreos shield

References

 
Taxa named by Franz Nopcsa von Felső-Szilvás
Hettangian first appearances
Maastrichtian extinctions